Heiko Bonan (born 10 February 1966) is a German football coach and former player. He is currently the head coach of FC 99 Aa Nethetal.

Playing career 
In the East German and (unified) German top-flight the midfielder amassed almost 300 appearances.

In 1989 and 1990 Bonan won two caps for the East Germany national team.

Career statistics

References

External links
 
 
 

Living people
1966 births
German footballers
Association football midfielders
East German footballers
East Germany international footballers
DDR-Oberliga players
Bundesliga players
2. Bundesliga players
1. FC Magdeburg players
Berliner FC Dynamo players
VfL Bochum players
Karlsruher SC players
FC Gütersloh 2000 players
Rot Weiss Ahlen players
SV Wilhelmshaven players
Rot-Weiss Essen players
German football managers
Rot Weiss Ahlen managers
Rot-Weiss Essen managers
Berliner FC Dynamo managers
People from Bezirk Magdeburg
Footballers from Saxony-Anhalt
German expatriate sportspeople in Saudi Arabia